This was the first edition of the tournament since 1991.

Juan Sebastián Cabal and Robert Farah won the title, defeating Raven Klaasen and Lu Yen-hsun in the final, 7–5, 4–6, [10–7].

Seeds

Draw

Draw

References
 Main draw

Doubles